HGA can stand for:
 Hammel, Green and Abrahamson, an architecture firm
 Handweavers Guild of America
 Holy Guardian Angel, a religious term
 High-gain antenna, for radio
 Human granulocytic anaplasmosis, a disease
 Hargeisa Airport
 Human Genetics Alert, originally Campaign Against Human Genetic Engineering